The Birecik Bridge is a  long deck arch bridge carrying the D.400 across the Euphrates in Birecik, Turkey.

Geography
The bridge is on the state highway , which runs from southwest to southeast Turkey. The river marks the boundary between Nizip district of Gaziantep Province and Birecik district of Şanlıurfa Province.

Project and construction

Up to 1956, travel between Gaziantep and Şanlıurfa was difficult, for all vehicles had to transfer to primitive ferries over the Fırat River. The bridge project was one of the major projects of Turkey in the 1950s. The awarded company was Amaç Ticaret Türk AŞ. The governmental inspection was carried out by the General Directorate of Highways. The construction began in August 1951 and the bridge was completed in March 1956.

Details
There are five arches over the river  and fourteen sections over the land. At the time of its completion, it was the  third longest bridge in Turkey, after the Karkamış Bridge and Uzunköprü Bridge.

One of the Turkey's top 50 civil engineering projects
Turkish Chamber of Civil Engineers lists Birecik Bridge as one of the fifty civil engineering feats in Turkey, a list of remarkable engineering projects realized in the first 50 years of the chamber.

References

Birecik District
Buildings and structures in Şanlıurfa Province
Road bridges in Turkey
Bridges completed in 1956
Crossings of the Euphrates
Bridges over the Euphrates River